Ruth Annaqtuusi Tulurialik (born 1934) is a Canadian Inuit artist. Tulurialik was born Qamani'tuaq (Baker Lake), Nunavut.

Her work is included in the collections of the National Gallery of Canada, the Portland Museum of Art, the Museum of Anthropology at the University of British Columbia, the Montreal Museum of Fine Arts, the National Museum of the American Indian, the McMichael Canadian Art Collection and the Winnipeg Art Gallery.

References

21st-century Canadian women artists
20th-century Canadian women artists
1934 births
Living people
21st-century Canadian artists
20th-century Canadian artists
Inuit artists
Artists from Nunavut